Montage is an album comprising four tracks led by jazz trombonist Eddie Bert, two by pianist John Mehegan and one by trumpeter Donald Byrd recorded in September 1955 and first released on the Savoy label.

Track listing
All compositions by Eddie Bert, except where indicated.
 "Steady Eddie" – 5:24
 "Crazy Rhythm" (Irving Caesar, Joseph Meyer, Roger Wolfe Kahn) 	
 "Slow Crosstown" – 9:37	
 "If I Love Again" (Ben Oakland, Jack Murray)	
 "Bronx Line" – 6:54	
 "I'll Take Romance" (Oakland, Oscar Hammerstein II) 	
 "Wishbone" – 6:33
Recorded at Van Gelder Studio, Hackensack, NJ on September 1 (tracks 1, 3, 5 & 7), September 20 (tracks 2 & 6), and September 29 (track 4), 1955

Personnel
Tracks 1, 3, 5 & 7
Eddie Bert – trombone 
J. R. Monterose – tenor saxophone
Hank Jones – piano
Clyde Lombardi – bass 
Kenny Clarke – drums
Tracks 2 & 6
John Mehegan – piano
Track 4
Donald Byrd – trumpet
Frank Foster – tenor saxophone
Hank Jones – piano
Paul Chambers – bass
Kenny Clarke – drums

References

Savoy Records albums
Eddie Bert albums
1955 albums
Albums produced by Ozzie Cadena
Albums recorded at Van Gelder Studio